William Keppel may refer to:

 Willem van Keppel, 2nd Earl of Albemarle (1702–1754)
 William Keppel (British Army officer, born 1727) (1727–1787), British general, son of the 2nd Earl of Albemarle
 William Keppel (British Army officer, died 1834), British general and colonial administrator
 William Keppel, 4th Earl of Albemarle (1772–1849)
 William Keppel, 7th Earl of Albemarle (1832–1894)